Jansenia dasiodes is a species of tiger beetle endemic to peninsular India. They measure  in body length.

References 

Cicindelidae
Beetles of Asia
Endemic arthropods of India
Beetles described in 1989